King of Birds may refer to:

"King of Birds", a  song by R.E.M. from the album Document.
The eagle is called the "King of Birds", but this title has also been given to the Philippine Eagle.
Haribon, means the king of the birds origin name of the Philippine Eagle
 The Philippine Eagle is commonly referred to as the "King of the Birds" around the world.

See also 

 Kingbird (disambiguation)
Bird Kingdom, an aviary in Niagara Falls, Ontario, Canada